The Capture of the Rosily Squadron, also known as the Battle of Poza de Santa Isabel, took place on 14 June 1808, in Cádiz, Spain, during the uprising against the French invaders. After an engagement with the Spanish lasting five days, French Admiral François Étienne de Rosily-Mesros surrendered his entire squadron with the four thousand seamen then on board.

Background
The Spanish conventional warfare had started with the Battles of El Bruch.

The spring of 1808 saw a deterioration in relations between erstwhile allies Spain and France, culminating in rebellions against the Spanish king Charles IV, leading to a French occupation and the placing of Joseph Bonaparte on the Spanish throne.

Under difficult circumstances, Rosily endeavoured to gain enough time for the arrival at Cádiz of French troops which had been dispatched from Madrid to Andalusia. He took up defensive positions, beyond the reach of the land batteries, in the channel which leads to La Carraca. While anchored there, he first offered to quit the bay, in order to quiet the multitude; he next proposed to the British, who were blockading the port, to send his cannon ashore, to keep his crews on board and to conceal his flag. In exchange, he required hostages for the safety of his sick and for the French inhabitants of Cádiz, and a pledge that he should be safe from attack. The British would not consent to this.

The Spanish governor of Cádiz, Tomás de Morla y Pacheco, refused to comply with the Rosily's demands, and instead  required that he should surrender his forces. On Rosily's refusal, the Spaniards sited batteries on the Isle of Leon and near Fort Louis.

French ships

The French ships and their numbers of guns were:

Neptune: 80
Héros: 74
Pluton: 74
Algesiras: 80
Argonaute: 74
Cornélie: 44

Battle

On 9 June, at 3 PM, a division of Spanish gun and mortar boats and the batteries erected on the Isle of Leon and at Fort Louis commenced hostilities against the French ships with steady fire, which was kept up until nightfall. The Spaniards had even requested that two ships of the line, Principe de Asturias (112) and Terrible (74), help them.

On the following morning, the 10th, the cannonade recommenced and continued until 2 PM, when the French flagship, Héros, hoisted a flag of truce. Shortly afterwards Vice-Admiral Rosily addressed a letter to Spanish governor Morla, offering to disembark his guns and ammunition, but to retain his men and not hoist any colours. These terms were considered unacceptable, the Spaniards prepared to renew the attack upon the French squadron with an increase of force. On the 14th, at 7 AM, an additional battery of 30 long 24-pounders were ready to act and numerous gun and mortar vessels took up their stations. The French ships struck their colours, which in the course of the forenoon, were replaced by those of Spain.

The British were impatient spectators of this action. Admiral Collingwood, who commanded the blockade of Cádiz, made an offer of co-operation, but his offer was refused by the Spanish. It was enough for them that the British should prevent the fleet from escaping; they were not disposed to give them any claim to a prey which would be captured without their aid.

The French suffered little human loss, the Spaniards had only four men killed. It being impossible for the French to offer much resistance, and certain of the success of his attack, the Spanish governor, Tomás Morla, did not wish to employ more violent means of destruction, such as heated shot.

Aftermath
The Spanish conventional warfare proceeded 
with the Battle of Bailén.

Immediately after the surrender of the French fleet, the Spanish Supreme Junta requested the British Admiral give passage in one of his vessels to the commissioners whom it wished to send for the purpose of negotiating with the Government of his Britannic Majesty for an alliance against Napoleon.

Mr George Canning, His Majesty's Foreign Secretary, stated:

"No longer remember that war has existed between Spain and Great Britain. Every nation which resists the exorbitant power of France becomes immediately, and whatever may have been its previous relations with us, the natural ally of Great Britain".

During the journey of 4 July, the British government emitted an order, declaring that all  hostilities between Great Britain and Spain would cease with immediate effect.

See also
Chronology of events of the Peninsular War

Notes

References

Further reading

External links
 

Conflicts in 1808
Battles involving Spain
Battles involving France
Military history of France
Naval battles of the Napoleonic Wars
Naval battles involving Spain
Naval battles involving France
Naval battles involving the United Kingdom
History of the French Navy
1808 in Spain
June 1808 events